is a railway station in Bungo-Ōno, Ōita Prefecture, Japan. It is operated by JR Kyushu and is on the Hōhi Main Line.

Lines

Layout 
The station consists of an island platform serving two tracks. The station building is a small modern functional steel frame structure which is unstaffed and serves only as a waiting room with an automatic ticket vending machine. Access to the island platform is by means of a footbridge.

Adjacent stations

History
The track was extended westwards in phases, with Inukai opening as the new western terminus on 20 July 1917. On 2 December 1928, the entire track from Kumamoto through Inukai to Ōita was designated as the Hōhi Main Line. With the privatization of Japanese National Railways (JNR), the successor of JGR, on 1 April 1987, the station came under the control of JR Kyushu.

In September 2017, Typhoon Talim (Typhoon 18) damaged the Hōhi Main Line at several locations. Services between Aso and Nakahanda, including Inukai, were suspended and replaced by bus services. Normal rail services between Aso and Ōita were restored by 2 October 2017.

Passenger statistics
In fiscal 2016, the station was used by an average of 324 passengers daily (boarding passengers only), and it ranked 299th among the busiest stations of JR Kyushu.

See also
List of railway stations in Japan

References

External links
Inukai (JR Kyushu)

Railway stations in Ōita Prefecture
Railway stations in Japan opened in 1917
Bungo-ōno, Ōita